4th Central Committee may refer to:
Central Committee of the 4th Congress of the Russian Social Democratic Labour Party, 1906–1907
4th Central Committee of the Bulgarian Communist Party, 1922–1948
4th Central Executive Committee of the Chinese Communist Party, 1925–1927
4th Central Committee of the Communist Party of Cuba, 1991–1997
4th Central Committee of the Socialist Unity Party of Germany, 1954–1958
4th Central Committee of the Polish United Workers' Party, 1964–1968
4th Central Committee of the Romanian Communist Party, 1928–1931
4th Central Committee of the Lao People's Revolutionary Party, 1986–1991
4th Central Committee of the Communist Party of Vietnam, 1976–1982
4th Central Committee of the Communist Party of Yugoslavia, 1928–1945
4th Central Committee of the Hungarian Working People's Party, 1948–1951
4th Central Committee of the Workers' Party of Korea, 1961–1970